Charles or Charlie Cox may refer to:

Charles Cox (wrestler) (born 1957), Canadian Olympic wrestler
Charles E. Cox (1860–1936), Indiana Supreme Court judge
Charles Frederick Cox (1863–1944), Australian soldier
Charles Winnans Cox (1882–1958), Canadian politician
Charles Shipley Cox (1922–2015), American oceanographer
Charlie Cox (born 1982), English actor
Charlie Cox (footballer, born 1905) (1905–1978), English footballer
Charlie Cox (footballer, born 1926) (1926–2008), Scottish footballer
Charlie Cox (Australian footballer) (1873–1947), Australian rules footballer 
Charlie Cox (racing driver) (born 1960), Australia motor racing commentator
Bud Cox (born Charles Cox, born 1960), American tennis player
Sir Charles Cox (brewer) (1660–1729), English brewer and MP
Charles Cox (businessman) (1731–1808), English businessman active in Harwich, Essex
Charles Chapman Cox, American economist, appointed to the U.S. Securities and Exchange Commission under Ronald Reagan
Charles Christopher Cox (born 1952), US politician and financial regulator

See also 
Charles Coxe (1661–1728), MP for Cirencester, and for Gloucester
Charles Westley Coxe, MP for Cricklade
Charles Cocks (disambiguation)